Sarıyar Dam is a dam  north of the town of Sarıyar in the Nallıhan district of Ankara Province. It was completed in 1956. The total power output from the hydroelectric facility is 160 MW (four facilities of 40 MW each).

Sources
Structurae: Sariyar Dam
Researchgate.net: The technical features of Goekcekaya Sariyar and Yenice Dam Lakes

Dams in Ankara Province
Hydroelectric power stations in Turkey
Dams completed in 1956
Energy infrastructure completed in 1956
Gravity dams
Dams in Eskişehir Province